Murse may refer to:

 Moers, city in Germany, spelled Murse in archaic Dutch
 A man's handbag  (portmanteau word from "male purse")
 A male nurse

See also
 Mirza, Persian title, a prince or educated man, variant spelling